Early Works may refer to:

 Early Works (Taylor Hicks album)
 Early Works (Rain album)
 Early Works (film), a 1969 Yugoslavian film